Happy (stylized in Japan as HAPPY) is a five piece independent Japanese band from Ayabe, Kyoto that formed in 2012. Performing a mix of indie pop and psychedelic pop music, the band sings exclusively in English. In 2014 they released their debut album Hello.

Biography 
The band formed in January 2012 in Ayabe, Kyoto when childhood friends Alec, Ric, Syu and Bob decided to create a band. Alec, Ric and Bob had gone to the same elementary school, and met Syu in junior high school. All four of the band members were a part of their school's basketball club, and performed their first live concert on a float for their town Ayabe's Christmas parade, in junior high school.

After giving up music for a while because of how busy basketball club was making them, Alex, Bob and Syu reformed as a three-member band, inspired by the music of The Doors. Ric joined the band later, performing keyboards, and the group became more interested in psychedelic music, as well as the music of The Velvet Underground and Pink Floyd's debut album The Piper at the Gates of Dawn (1967) when they continued to play through their high school years. In their final years of high school, the band members became friends with Koji Shimotsu of the band Odotte Bakari no Kuni, who introduced them to more recent musical acts such as Justice and Gorillaz, heavily influencing the band's sound.

Chew joined the band in 2012, when the group officially became Happy. He had known the other members after meeting them at basketball matches between their high schools. When the members were still living in Ayabe, they went to stay at Chew's apartment in Osaka when they performed live concerts in Osaka and Kobe, eventually leading Chew to join the band. In 2013 performed at the Summer Sonic Festival, and in March 2014 performed a tour in the United States with Japan Nite, an event organized by South by Southwest.

The band released their first single in March 2014 exclusively to Tower Records stores, Sun, featuring the songs "Lift this Weight" and "Win Key Gun". This was followed by a double A-side single "Wake Up" / "Lucy" in June, also exclusive to Tower Records. These singles led up to the release of their debut album Hello in October 2014, released under their own independent label Happy Records. In May 2015, the band released a follow-up extended play To the Next, led by the song "R.A.D.I.O.". In September 2015, Happy released a collaboration EP with electronic band 80kidz.

Artistry 
The band are inspired by 1960s and 1970s Western music. Each member has more than one role in the band, performing on multiple instruments. CDJournal reviewers likened the band to American band MGMT and Australian band Tame Impala, praising the emotional falsetto vocals of lead singer Alec. In January 2015, Hello was listed in the shortlist for the top album of the year for the 2015 CD Shop Awards.

Members 
Alec (born November 16, 1993) - guitar and vocals
Ric (born January 4, 1994) - synthesizers and vocals
Chew (born October 3, 1993) - guitar and synthesizers
Syu (born February 28, 1994) - bass guitar and synthesizers
Bob (born September 11, 1992) - drums and vocals

Discography

Studio album

Extended plays

Singles

As lead artists

As featured artists

Promotional singles

Notes

References

External links 

 

2012 establishments in Japan
Japanese alternative rock groups
Japanese indie rock groups
Musical groups established in 2012
Musical groups from Kyoto Prefecture
Musical quintets